Marco Roccati (born 1 July 1975 in Pinerolo, Province of Turin) is a retired Italian footballer who played as a goalkeeper.

Roccati spent the 2000–01 season on loan at Scottish club Dundee. In a Scottish Cup match against Hearts in February 2001 he saved a Colin Cameron penalty in a 1–1 draw.

Honours
UEFA Intertoto Cup: 1998

References

External links

1975 births
Living people
People from Pinerolo
Italian footballers
Italian expatriate footballers
Bologna F.C. 1909 players
Dundee F.C. players
Association football goalkeepers
Ravenna F.C. players
ACF Fiorentina players
A.C. Perugia Calcio players
Empoli F.C. players
A.S.D. Gallipoli Football 1909 players
U.S. Pistoiese 1921 players
A.C. Ancona players
Serie A players
Scottish Premier League players
Expatriate footballers in Scotland
Italian expatriate sportspeople in Scotland
A.S.D. Calcio Ivrea players
Footballers from Piedmont
Sportspeople from the Metropolitan City of Turin